Mir Bazar (also Romanized as Mīr Bāzār; also known as Bālā Mīr Bāzār, Mīr Bāzār-e Bālā, and Mir Qal‘eh) is a village in Pazevar Rural District, Rudbast District, Babolsar County, Mazandaran Province, Iran. At the 2006 census, its population was 1,689, in 446 families.

References 

Populated places in Babolsar County